This is a list of Latvian football transfers in the 2014 summer transfer window by club. Only transfers of the Virsliga are included.

All transfers mentioned are shown in the references at the bottom of the page. If you wish to insert a transfer that isn't mentioned there, please add a reference.

Latvian Higher League

Ventspils 

In:

Out:

Skonto 

In:

Out:

Daugava Daugavpils 

In:

Out:

Daugava Rīga 

In:

Out:

Liepāja 

In:

Out:

Jūrmala 

In:

Out:

Spartaks 

In:

Out:

Jelgava 

In:

Out:

METTA/LU 

In:

Out:

BFC Daugavpils 

In:

Out:

References

External links 
 sportacentrs.com 

2014
Latvia
Football
transfers